Khalimatus Sadiyah (born 17 September 1999) is an Indonesian para badminton player. She won the first para-badminton gold medal for Indonesia in the women's doubles SL3–SU5 event of the 2020 Summer Paralympics with Leani Ratri Oktila.

Awards and nominations

Achievements

Paralympic Games 
Women's doubles

World Championships 
Women's singles

Women’s doubles

Mixed doubles

Asian Para Games 
Women's singles

Women’s doubles

Mixed doubles

Asian Championships

Women's singles

Women's doubles

ASEAN Para Games 

Women's singles

Women's doubles

Mixed doubles

Asian Youth Para Games 

Women's singles

Mixed doubles

BWF Para Badminton World Circuit (4 titles, 2 runners-up) 

The BWF Para Badminton World Circuit – Grade 2, Level 1, 2 and 3 tournaments has been sanctioned by the  Badminton World Federation from 2022. 

Women's singles 

Women's doubles

Mixed doubles

International Tournaments (14 titles, 5 runners-up) 

Women's singles 

Women's doubles  

Mixed doubles

References

Notes

External links
 Khalimatus Sadiyah at BWFpara.tournamentsoftware.com

1999 births
Living people
People from Mojokerto
Indonesian female badminton players
Paralympic badminton players of Indonesia
Paralympic gold medalists for Indonesia
Paralympic medalists in badminton
Badminton players at the 2020 Summer Paralympics
Medalists at the 2020 Summer Paralympics
Indonesian para-badminton players
20th-century Indonesian women
21st-century Indonesian women